Jacqueline Weis Liebergott assumed the presidency of Emerson College as its first female president in September 1993 and during her tenure spearheaded the college's move from Boston's Back Bay to the theatre district. This move resulted in unprecedented growth and success for the institution.

A graduate of the University of Maryland, Liebergott earned her master's and doctoral degrees in speech-language pathology from the University of Pittsburgh. She is also a trustee of the Corporation of the Foundation of the Massachusetts Eye and Ear Infirmary and she serves on the New England Council. She is also involved with the Friends of the Public Garden and Boston Common, Downtown Crossing Association.

Liebergott at Emerson College 

Liebergott started at Emerson College as a professor in the division of Communication Sciences and Disorders. She progressed up the ranks to graduate dean, academic dean, vice president and interim president before being elected president in 1993.

As president, she reorganized the college's academic departments, strengthened the college's enrollment, reputation and finances, and eventually moved the campus from Back Bay Boston to greatly enhanced facilities in the historic Boston Theater District off the Boston Common.

Her salary for 2009 was projected to be $680,000.

Liebergott signed the Amethyst initiative, agreeing to lower the drinking age to 18.

On December 2, 2009, Liebergott announced to the Emerson community her retirement, effective June 30, 2011.

See also

 Emerson College
 Liebergott as President, accessed 7/25/10

References

External links
 Emerson College President's Home Page

Presidents of Emerson College
Emerson College faculty
University of Maryland, College Park alumni
Living people
People from Maryland
People from Uxbridge, Massachusetts
Year of birth missing (living people)